Scheffer is a German occupational surname related to German Schäfer (meaning "shepherd") or Schaffer (meaning "overseer").  Notable people with the surname include:

Aaron Scheffer (born 1975), American baseball pitcher
Ary Scheffer (1795–1858), Dutch-born French painter, son of Johann Baptist and Cornelia
Cornelia Scheffer (1769–1839), Dutch painter and portrait miniaturist
Cornélia Scheffer (1830-1899), French sculptor and designer
David Scheffer (born 1953), American diplomat, UN Ambassador-at-Large for War Crimes Issues
Emmanuel Scheffer (1924–2012), Israeli football player and coach
François Scheffer (1766–1844), Luxembourgian politician, Mayor of Luxembourg City
Frank Scheffer (born 1956), Dutch cinematographer
Guus Scheffer (1898–1952), Dutch weightlifter
Hendrik Scheffer (1798–1862), Dutch-born French painter, son of Johann Baptist and Cornelia
Henrik Teofilus Scheffer (1710–1759), Swedish chemist
Jaap de Hoop Scheffer (born 1948), Dutch politician, former Secretary General of NATO
James Scheffer, American record producer and songwriter
Johan Scheffer (born 1948), Australian (Victorian) politician
Johann Baptist Scheffer (1773–1809), German-born Dutch painter
Johannes Scheffer (1621–1679), Swedish humanist
Karl-Heinz Scheffer, West German slalom canoeist
Marten Scheffer, Dutch ecologist
Paul Scheffer (born 1954), Dutch multiculturalism scholar and author
 (1909–1988), Dutch band composer and conductor
Rudolph Herman Christiaan Carel Scheffer (1621–1679), Dutch botanist
Victor Blanchard Scheffer (1906–2011), American mammalogist
Will Scheffer, American playwright

See also
Scheffers
United States v. Scheffer, 
Schaefer

References

Dutch-language surnames